This is a survey of the postage stamps and postal history of the Marshall Islands.

The Republic of the Marshall Islands (RMI) is a Micronesian nation of atolls and islands in the middle of the Pacific Ocean, just west of the International Date Line and just north of the Equator.

Pre-independence

The islands first used German stamps in 1888, with overprinted German stamps for the Marshall Islands becoming available in 1897. Stamps of German Marshall Islands were also valid in Nauru. After WWI, as part of mandated territory, stamps of Japan were used from 1914 to 1944. The islands became part of the United Nations Trust Territory of the Pacific in 1947 and used U.S. stamps until 1984.

Independence
Marshall Islands has issued stamps since achieving postal independence in 1984.

See also
Postage stamps and postal history of the German colonies
Postage stamps and postal history of Nauru
Postage stamps and postal history of the Federated States of Micronesia
Postage stamps and postal history of Palau

References

External links
U.S. Pacific Islands Bulletin

Communications in the Marshall Islands
History of the Marshall Islands
Marshall Islands

The website of the U.S. Pacific Islands Bulletin is now:   https://sites.google.com/site/pacificislanditems/united-states-pacific-islands-bulletin